{{safesubst:#invoke:RfD|||month = March
|day = 13
|year = 2023
|time = 16:28
|timestamp = 20230313162849

|content=
REDIRECT Motivation impairment effect

}}